Zurab Ionanidze (born 2 December 1971) is a former Georgian footballer, of ethnic Assyrian extraction.

Club career
Ionanidze previously played for FC Zhemchuzhina Sochi and FC Lokomotiv Nizhny Novgorod in the Russian Premier League.

Career statistics

International goals

References

External links

1971 births
Sportspeople from Kutaisi
Living people
Footballers from Georgia (country)
Association football forwards
Georgia (country) international footballers
FC Samgurali Tskaltubo players
FC Samtredia players
FC Torpedo Kutaisi players
SC Tavriya Simferopol players
FC Zhemchuzhina Sochi players
FC Lokomotiv Nizhny Novgorod players
FC Zestafoni players
Russian Premier League players
Erovnuli Liga players
Ukrainian Premier League players
Expatriate footballers from Georgia (country)
Expatriate footballers in Ukraine
Expatriate sportspeople from Georgia (country) in Ukraine